Stephen George is an Indian politician.  He was a young leader of Kerala Congress (Mani), a splinter faction of Kerala Congress and a former Member of the Legislative Assembly (MLA) from  Kaduthuruthy in the Kottayam district.

References

Members of the Kerala Legislative Assembly
Living people
People from Kottayam district
Kerala Congress (M) politicians
Year of birth missing (living people)